Chigurida Kanasu is a 2003 Indian Kannada-language film directed by T. S. Nagabharana and starring Shiva Rajkumar, Anant Nag, Vidhya Venkatesh, Rekha Unnikrishnan and Avinash. It is based on the 1951 novel of the same name by legendary Kannada litterateur and Jnanpith Award winner K. Shivaram Karanth. The movie was considered one of finest movies in the history of Kannada cinema. It is a milestone movie in the career of Shiva Rajkumar. The movie was remade into Hindi as Swades starring Shah Rukh Khan in 2004.

Jayant Kaikini debuted as a lyricist, with his first song Bandhuve sung by the legendary Dr. Rajkumar. Kaikini would go on to become a very successful and popular lyricist in the Kannada film industry.

Plot
B. Shankar (Shivarajkumar) is born and raised in Delhi. He will be studying engineering at the Banaras Hindu University. He has a doting father B. Sundara Rao (Anant Nag) and a loud, annoying and a threatening mother. Shankar has a younger brother, a pilot. Shankar is content with his life, but something in his heart tells him this is not where he belongs. Shankar's girlfriend (who lives in Delhi) Varalakshmi (Vidhya Venkatesh) is a Kannadati. His college friend Seetharam (Raju Ananthaswamy) from Karnataka, teaches him Kannada to talk with Varalakshmi. When Shankar returns to Delhi, his mother plans to marry him off and he reluctantly agrees to meet his bride-to-be. In the party, During the conversation he realizes the letter "B" in his name is for "Bangaadi". But he doesn't know whether Bangaadi is a person or a town, and is curious about its significance. When Shankar is speaking in Kannada with his brother over the phone for fun, his father hears it. And his father says, "Speak in Kannada, my son. It has been so long since I have heard that language". Then, Shankar discovers he is a Kannadiga and is happy that he's at least found his Origin. His father confesses that his father (Shankar's Grandfather) abandoned his native but he didn't try to go back even once. Shankar wants to discover his native.

So, Shankar visits Seethram's Home. There he realizes that Bangaadi is a small village near Seethram's home. Then, he plans to visit Bangaadi. There, Shankar meets his grand-aunt, an old, frail woman who is delighted to see her brother (Shankar's Grandfather) reincarnated before her eyes. She tells the story of her life, and what led Shankar's grandfather to flee. She shows him their family's land and asks him to help rebuild their house, which has fallen into disrepair. Shankar's grand-aunt's master, Shanbhog (Avinash), resents his arrival after all these years. He had a young, cheerful daughter Srimathi (Rekha Unnikrishnan), who teaches Kannada to the small kids around. Shankar seriously thinks about his grand-aunt's words.

Shankar returns to his home in Delhi with the news for his father, wanting to return to Bangaadi with his entire family (including Varalakshmi). However, none of them want to go with him. Varalakshmi, who is practising medicine refuses to come with him as her career was important to her.

When Shankar comes to Bangaadi, he initially faces many problems because of Shanbhog. But he somehow successfully builds a bridge across the river, sets up a Micro Hydro-Electric project to generate Electricity which can be used for Fencing. He also starts to cultivate his land. He gets all help for his work from Muttaiah (Krishnegowda). The love and respect that Shankar got from the village residents in a short span of time makes Shanbhog furious and envious of Shankar. Meanwhile, Srimathi loves him and dreams of a life with him.

Varalakshmi once arrives to Bangaadi, wishing to be him. But Srimathi meets her and begs her to sacrifice her love for Srimathi. Varalakshmi does so and returns to Delhi with a broken heart.

Shankar's hard work gain him reward and all the village people set off for a Celebration for the crops harvesting time. During this, Shankar's Grandmother falls ill and breathes her last.
Shanbhog also restricts Srimathi not to go out of the Home. But her mother helps her to escape out of her house. She arrives at Shankar's home. But at this time, she falls sick due to the plague. Shankar tries to take her to the city. But Shanbhog, in anger destroys the bridge. So, Srimathi breathes her last due to lack of Medical Treatment.

Finally, Shankar loses all hopes in his life and he is all set to leave Bangaadi to return to Delhi. Then, his father, mother and Varalakshmi everyone comes to him and says that they are ready to live with him in their native village, Bangaadi. His mother learns Kannada, Varalakshmi sets up a clinic in that village while Shanbhog, seriously shocked by his daughter's death becomes mentally challenged and begins to construct a bridge which he destroyed.

Cast
Shiva Rajkumar as Bangaadi Shankar 
Vidhya Venkatesh as Varalakshmi 
Rekha Unnikrishnan as Shrimathi
Anant Nag as Bangaadi Sundar Rao 
Avinash as Shanubhoga Rangaraya
Raju Ananthaswamy as Seetharam
Ashok as Deputy Commissioner 
Sundar Raj as Tahasildar M Sundar Raj
Krishnegowda as Muttaiah 
Rameshwari Varma as Ajji
Pushpa Swamy as Shrimathi Mother
Pankaj Tripathi as Shankar's college friend at BHU , Uncredited Role

Soundtrack

Reception

Although Chigurida Kanasu received critical acclaim, it did not do well at the box office. Chigurida Kanasu is now considered one of the best movies in the history of Kannada cinema. The role of Shankar done by Shivarajkumar in this movie is considered one of his most outstanding and brilliant performance. The idea of the protagonist loving his roots, going to his village and setting up a Micro Hydro-Electric project to generate electricity can also be seen in the Hindi cult classic Swades. Nagabharana had revealed that when Swades appeared before him when he was a jury member for the selection of National Awards chairmaned by Sudhir Mishra, he expressed his opinion to his fellow jury members that he felt Swades to be a replica of his film in its core theme, plot elements and treatment and the members were in agreement to his contention.

Awards

2003–04 Karnataka State Film Awards

 First Best Film - Parvathamma Rajkumar
 Best Direction - T. S. Nagabharana
 Best Actor - Shiva Rajkumar
 Best Dialogues - Jayanth Kaikini
 Best Music - V. Manohar

References

2000s Kannada-language films
2003 films
Films based on Indian novels
Films scored by V. Manohar
Kannada films remade in other languages
Films directed by T. S. Nagabharana